Erlandiini is a tribe of beetles in the subfamily Cerambycinae, containing the single genus Erlandia and the following species:

 Erlandia inopinata Aurivillius, 1904
 Erlandia mexicana Noguera & Chemsak, 2001

References

Cerambycinae